William Rufus Dickie (February 20, 1916 – December 23, 1997) was a Canadian chemist and professional ice hockey goaltender who played in one National Hockey League game for the Chicago Black Hawks during the 1941–42 NHL season. Dickie replaced Sam LoPresti in a 4–3 victory over the Montreal Canadiens on February 5, 1942.

Early life 
Born in Campbellton, New Brunswick, Dickie played for Campbellton Collegiate in 1932 and 1933. He attended Mount Allison University from 1933 to 1937 where, as a goaltender, he was captain of the Mount Allison Mounties.

Career 
Dickie played for the Saint John Beavers in Saint John, New Brunswick, from 1937 to 1939. A chemist by training, Dickie was working for the Dominion Steel and Coal Corporation's steel mill in Sydney, Nova Scotia, at the start of World War II and played for the Sydney Millionaires from 1939 to 1941. Dickie moved to Montreal, QC and played for the Montreal Pats in 1941 and 1942. It was during this season that he was called up to play a single game for the Chicago Black Hawks.

See also
List of players who played only one game in the NHL

External links

References

1916 births
1997 deaths
Canadian ice hockey goaltenders
Canadian military personnel of World War II
Chicago Blackhawks players
Ice hockey people from New Brunswick
Mount Allison University alumni
People from Campbellton, New Brunswick
Canadian chemists
Canadian expatriate ice hockey players in the United States